The 1890 West Donegal by-election was a parliamentary by-election held for the United Kingdom House of Commons constituency of West Donegal on 30 May 1890. The vacancy arose because of the resignation of the sitting member, Patrick O'Hea of the Irish Parliamentary Party. Only one candidate was nominated, James Joseph Dalton of the Irish Parliamentary Party, who was elected unopposed.

Result

References

1890 elections in the United Kingdom
May 1890 events
By-elections to the Parliament of the United Kingdom in County Donegal constituencies
Unopposed by-elections to the Parliament of the United Kingdom in Irish constituencies
1890 elections in Ireland